Stone's theorem may refer to a number of theorems of Marshall Stone:

 Stone's representation theorem for Boolean algebras
 Stone–Weierstrass theorem
 Stone–von Neumann theorem
 Stone's theorem on one-parameter unitary groups

It may also refer to the theorem of A. H. Stone that for Hausdorff spaces the property of being a paracompact space and being a fully normal space are equivalent, or its immediate corollary that metric spaces are paracompact.